The Srubnaya culture, also known as Timber-grave culture, was a Late Bronze Age 1850–1450 BC culture in the eastern part of Pontic–Caspian steppe. It is a successor of the Yamna culture, Catacomb culture and Poltavka culture. It is co-ordinate and probably closely related to the Andronovo culture, its eastern neighbor. Whether the Srubnaya culture originated in the east, west, or was a local development, is disputed among archaeologists.

The Srubnaya culture is generally associated with archaic Iranian speakers. The name comes from Russian сруб (srub), "timber framework", from the way graves were constructed.

Distribution
The Srubnaya culture occupied the area along and above the north shore of the Black Sea from the Dnieper eastwards along the northern base of the Caucasus to the area abutting the north shore of the Caspian Sea, west of the Ural Mountains. Historical testimony indicate that the Srubnaya culture was succeeded by the Scythians.

Characteristics

The Srubnaya culture is named for its use of timber constructions within its burial pits. Its cemeteries consisted of five to ten kurgans. Burials included the skulls and forelegs of animals and ritual hearths. Stone cists were occasionally employed. Srubnaya settlements consisted of semi-subterranean and two-roomed houses. The presence of bronze sickles, grinding stones, domestic cattle, sheep and pigs indicate that the Srubnaya engaged in both agriculture and stockbreeding.

The use of chariots in the Srubnaya culture is indicated by finds of studded antler cheek-pieces (for controlling chariot horses), burials of paired domesticated horses, and ceramic vessels with images of two-wheeled vehicles on them. The predecessor of the Srubnaya culture, a variant of the Abashevo culture known as the Pokrovka type, is considered to be an important part of the early ‘chariot horizon’, representing the rapid spread of the 'chariot complex'.

Language
The Srubnaya culture is generally considered to have been Iranian. Its area, which coincides with the presence of Iranian hydronyms, has been suggested as a staging region from which the Iranian peoples migrated across the Caucasus into the Iranian Plateau.

Genetics 

Mathieson et al. (2015) surveyed 14 individuals of the Srubnaya culture. Six men from 5 different cemeteries belonged to the Y-chromosome haplogroup R1a1. Extractions of mtDNA from fourteen individuals were determined to represent five samples of haplogroup H, four samples of haplogroup U5, two samples of T1, one sample of T2, one sample of K1b, one of J2b and one of I1a.

A 2017 genetic study published in Scientific Reports found that the Scythians shared similar mitochondrial lineages with the Srubnaya culture. The authors of the study suggested that the Srubnaya culture was ancestral to the Scythians.

In 2018, a genetic study of the earlier Srubnaya culture, and later peoples of the Scythian cultures, including the Cimmerians, Scythians, Sarmatians, was published in Science Advances. Six males from two sites ascribed to the Srubnaya culture were analysed, and were all found to possess haplogroup R1a1a1. Cimmerian, Sarmatian and Scythian males were however found have mostly haplogroup R1b1a1a2, although one Sarmatian male carried haplogroup R1a1a1. The authors of the study suggested that rather than being ancestral to the Scythians, the Srubnaya shared with them a common origin from the earlier Yamnaya culture.

In a genetic study published in Science in 2018, the remains of twelve individuals ascribed to the Srubnaya culture was analyzed. Of the six samples of Y-DNA extracted, three belonged to R1a1a1b2 or subclades of it, one belonged to R1, one belonged to R1a1, and one belonged to R1a1a. With regards to mtDNA, five samples belonged to subclades of U, five belonged to subclades of H, and two belonged to subclades of T. People of the Srubnaya culture were found to be closely related to people of the Corded Ware culture, the Sintashta culture, Potapovka culture and the Andronovo culture. These were found to harbor mixed ancestry from the Yamnaya culture and peoples of the Central European Middle Neolithic. The genetic data suggested that these cultures were ultimately derived of a remigration of Central European peoples with steppe ancestry back into the steppe.

Gallery

See also
 Trzciniec culture
 Tumulus culture
 Nordic Bronze Age
 Unetice culture

Notes

References

Bibliography

External links 
 
Srubnaya sundial
Marks of heliacal rising of Sirius on the sundial of the Bronze Age

Archaeological cultures of Eastern Europe
Bronze Age cultures of Europe
Archaeological cultures in Russia
Archaeological cultures in Ukraine
Iranian archaeological cultures
History of Ural